The North American Mycological Association (NAMA), is a non-profit organization of amateurs and professionals who are interested in fungi, including mushrooms, morels, truffles, molds, and related organisms. NAMA aims "to promote, pursue, and advance the science of mycology."

Membership
Membership is open to all persons interested in fungi, including both professionals and amateurs of any skill level.

Publications
The official journal of NAMA is McIlvainea: The Journal of Amateur Mycology, which is published bi-annually.

NAMA members also receive The Mycophile, NAMA's bi-monthly newsletter.

NAMA members also provide educational material for teaching and learning about fungi via their website.

Activities
Since 1961, NAMA has sponsored an annual foray, at which members meet to collect and identify mushrooms and other fungi.  Each year the foray takes place in a different location in North America.

NAMA tracks North American mushroom poisoning cases (of humans and animals), and maintains a registry for submission of new cases. NAMA also provides a guide to mushroom poisoning symptoms.

See also
 Mycological Society of America, NAMA's sister society for professional mycologists

External links
 Official webpage of the North American Mycological Association
 NAMA Registry of Mushroom Poisoning cases

Mycology organizations
Year of establishment missing